Nine ships of the Royal Navy have borne the name HMS Dart, after the River Dart in Devon:

  was a 28-gun sloop-of-war launched in 1796 and broken up in 1809.
  was a 10-gun cutter, the mercantile Belerina or Ballerina, which had been building at Mevagissey in 1809; the Royal Navy purchased her in 1810 and she was lost at sea in between October and December 1813.
  was a 3-gun  launched in 1847, converted to a coastguard vessel and renamed WV.26 in 1863 and broken up in 1875.
  was a wooden  launched in 1860. She was renamed HMS Kangaroo in 1882 and broken up in 1884.
  was the ex-colonial yacht Cruiser, transferred in 1882, lent to the New South Wales government in 1904 and sold in 1912.
 , a PC-class sloop launched in 1918, was renamed  HMS Dart in 1925. She was sold for breaking in 1938.
  was a  launched in 1942 and sold for breaking in 1956.

Also
HM hired armed cutter Dart (1803–1805)

References

Royal Navy ship names